J. Saunders Redding (October 13, 1906 - March 2, 1988) was a professor and author in the United States. He was the first African American faculty member in the Ivy League.

Early life 
Jay Saunders Redding was born October 13, 1906, in Wilmington, Delaware. After a year at  Lincoln University, Redding transferred to Brown University, where he graduated in 1928. Redding received his master's degree from Brown in 1932.

Career 
In 1949, Redding was hired as a visiting professor at Brown University, becoming the first African American to teach at an Ivy League institution. In 1970, Redding became the first African American professor at Cornell University's College of Arts and Sciences and then retired in 1975.

Works 
Redding's literary works include To Make a Poet Black (1939), an autobiography, No Day of Triumph (1944), Stranger and Alone (1950), They Came in Chains (1950, revised edition 1973), An American in India (1954), and Cavalcade (1970), an African American literature anthology he edited with Arthur P. Davis.

Redding died on March 5, 1988, in Ithaca, New York at age 81.

References

External links

Britannica.com
 

1906 births
1988 deaths
African-American writers
Brown University alumni
Brown University faculty
20th-century African-American people
Cornell University faculty